The Letov Š-20 was a fighter aircraft produced in Czechoslovakia during the 1920s.

Design and development
The Letov Š-20 was a conventional, single-bay biplane with unstaggered wings, braced by N-struts. In overall appearance, it greatly resembled contemporary SPAD fighters. The fuselage and empennage were of welded steel tube construction and covered in fabric. The wings had a tubular metal spar but were otherwise wooden, and also fabric-covered.

The Czechoslovakian Air Force bought 105 machines, and ten examples were produced for Lithuania under the designation Š-20L. These remained in service until 1936 and 1935 respectively.

Operational history
An Š-20 placed second in the single-engine category of the national President of the Republic air race in 1925, but fared better the following year. In the 1926 race, an Š-20 not only won this category, but also set a new national airspeed record of 234 km/h (146 mph). This record was short-lived, however, since the prize for the fastest circuit was also won in an Š-20, and this raised the record to 245 km/h (153 mph).

A single prototype of an unarmed advanced trainer version was built as the Š-21, but this did not sell.

Variants
 Š-20 – initial production version
 Š-20M – revised version with slimmed down rear fuselage (main production version for Czechoslovakia)
 Š-20L – export version for Lithuania (eight built)

 Š-20R – version with further revisions to fuselage (one built)
 Š-20J – version with Walter-built Bristol Jupiter engine
 Š-21 – trainer version with Hispano-Suiza 8Aa engine (one built)

Specifications (Š-20)

See also

References

Notes

Further reading
 
 
 

1920s Czechoslovakian fighter aircraft
S-20
Biplanes
Single-engined tractor aircraft
Aircraft first flown in 1925